The Gare du Nord (English: station of the North or Northern Station), officially Paris-Nord, is one of the seven large mainline railway station termini in Paris, France. The station accommodates the trains that run between the capital and northern France via the Paris–Lille railway, as well as to international destinations in Belgium, Germany, the Netherlands and the United Kingdom. Located in the northern part of Paris near the Gare de l'Est in the 10th arrondissement, the Gare du Nord offers connections with several urban transport lines, including Paris Métro, RER and buses. The majority of its passengers have been commuters travelling between the northern suburbs of Paris and outlying towns. It is the busiest railway station in Europe by total passenger numbers; in 2015, the Gare du Nord saw more than 700,000 passengers per day.

The current Gare du Nord was designed by French architect Jacques Ignace Hittorff, while the original complex was constructed between 1861 and 1864 on behalf of the Chemin de Fer du Nord company. The station replaced an earlier and much smaller terminal sharing the same name, which was operational between 1846 and 1860. A substantial refurbishment programme being performed during the late 2010s and early 2020s will greatly redesign the station. The plans for this include a significant expansion of the station's footprint and ability to handle passengers, expanding onsite amenities and establishing a new departure terminal in preparation for the 2024 Summer Olympics. As a consequence of this redevelopment, the Gare du Nord will become the largest railway station in Europe.

Early history

Predecessor

The first Gare du Nord was constructed on behalf of the Chemins de fer du Nord company, which was managed by Léonce Reynaud, professor of architecture at the École Polytechnique. During 1843, the engineer Onfroy de Bréville, having been placed in charge of the first section of the company's proposed line between Paris and Amiens, produced a report that considered two different options for the terminal station. Management opted to construct the less spacious of the two options, despite the occurrence of stations serving capital city becoming overwhelmed already being a known phenomenon in both London and Brussels. For his part, de Bréville promoted the smaller option as being more than adequate to meet demand and reducing its impact on the existing neighbourhood of Clos Saint-Lazare; it was also considerably cheaper than the larger alternative option.

The engineer and architect Francois-Leonce Reynaud was appointed to design the station itself. In terms of its basic configuration, the station accommodated a total of six tracks and two large platforms underneath a single shed. This shed, which was divided into two naves, was supported by a series of cast iron columns and wooden trusses; the structure featured a relatively distinctive drainage system that used the hollow columns as drain pipes directly into the city's sewers. Road traffic was directed to a large courtyard set to the side of the station.

On 14 June 1846, the first Gare du Nord station was inaugurated; that same year, the Paris–Lille railway was also declared to be operational. During the following decade, not only was there a major boom in railway traffic as the French network rapidly expanded, Napoleon III himself heavily advocated for grand investments in infrastructure to be made, with the railways being a prime recipient of the French state's attention. During the late 1850s, it had become clear that the original Gare du Nord would be far too small to accommodate the demands of a major terminal station, thus it was decided to replace it entirely. The decision to redevelop the station was considerably eased by the expense of doing so being shared between the company and the city. Accordingly, the station building was partially demolished in 1860 to provide space for the current station; the original station's façade was removed and transferred to Lille station (now Lille-Flandres).

Current station

The chairman of the Chemin de Fer du Nord railway company, James Mayer de Rothschild, chose the French architect Jacques Ignace Hittorff to design the current station. Construction of the new complex was carried out between May 1861 to December 1865; the new station actually opened for service while still under construction during 1864. The façade was designed around a triumphal arch and used many slabs of stone. The building has the usual U-shape of a terminus station. The main support beam is made out of cast iron. The support pillars inside the station were made at Alston & Gourley's ironworks in Glasgow in the United Kingdom, the only country with a foundry large enough for the task.

The sculptural display represents the principal cities served by the company. Eight of the nine most majestic statues, crowning the building along the cornice line, illustrate destinations outside France, with the ninth figure of Paris in the centre. Fourteen more modest statues representing northern European cities are lower on the façade. The sculptors represented are:

London and Vienna by Jean-Louis Jaley
Brussels and Warsaw by François Jouffroy
Amsterdam by Charles Gumery
Frankfurt by Gabriel Thomas
Berlin by Jean-Joseph Perraud
Cologne by Mathurin Moreau
Paris, Boulogne and Compiegne by Pierre-Jules Cavelier
Arras and Laon by Théodore-Charles Gruyère
Lille and Beauvais by Charles-François Lebœuf
Valenciennes and Calais by Philippe Joseph Henri Lemaire
Rouen and Amiens by Eugène-Louis Lequesne
Douai and Dunkirk by Gustave Crauck
Cambrai and Saint-Quentin by Auguste Ottin

It was originally planned that a monumental avenue would be constructed leading up to the station's façade, cutting through the old street layout. Between 1838 and 1859, around a dozen separate proposals to redevelop the streets around Gare du Nord were tabled. However, no such redevelopment ever happened despite the extensive rebuilding of Paris headed by the Baron Georges-Eugène Haussmann; the Gare du Nord's absence from Haussmann's work has been referred to as "exhibiting arbitrariness and inconsistency". According to the railway historian Micheline Nilsen, the decision not to proceed with the redevelopment has been typically attributed to Haussmann and his personal displeasure that the city would have to bear such great expense on behalf of the Gare du Nord, and that Haussmann's overall attitude led to a pronounced understatement of the railways. Whatever the reason, the station has persistently suffered problems with a lack of space and poor access.

Services 
Like other Parisian railway stations, the Gare du Nord rapidly proved to be too small to handle persistent increases in railway traffic. Accordingly, the station has been periodically reconfigured. During 1884, engineers were able to install five supplementary tracks. During 1889, the station's interior was completely rebuilt, while an extension was constructed along its eastern side to serve the suburban rail lines. Further rounds of expansion work were carried out between the 1930s and the 1960s.

Beginning in 1906 and 1908, the station was served by the Metro Line 4 (which crosses Paris from north to south) and the terminus of Metro Line 5 (which ran to Étoile through Place d'Italie. In 1942, Line 5 was extended towards the northern suburbs of Pantin and Bobigny, while its south terminus was set to Place d'Italie. Metro Line 2 (station La Chapelle) is linked to the Gare du Nord via a tunnel. One enters the Métro station; instead of climbing the stairs that lead to the elevated Métro line (not all of Line 2 is elevated), one descends several flights of stairs, before traversing a long, arched circular hallway to enter the station.

During 1994, the arrival of high speed Eurostar international services required another reorganisation of the rail tracks:
Platforms 1 and 2: Service platforms, not open to the public.
Platforms 3 to 6: Terminus of the London Eurostar via the Channel Tunnel. Access to these trains is from the upper level, reached by an escalator opposite platform 17.
Platforms 7 and 8: Thalys platforms for Belgium, Germany and the Netherlands.
Platforms 9 to 18: TGV North Europe, Main Line trains, and some Picard TER.
Platforms 19 to 21: Picard TER.
Platforms 30 to 36: Suburban station, Transiliens and Picard TER (Paris-Beauvais line)
Platforms 41 to 44 (underground): RER station, lines B and D.
4 Métro Platforms (underground): Lines 4&5

It is also connected to Magenta RER Station (4 platforms, line E) and La Chapelle Métro Station (2 platforms, line 2).

After the 'Additional Protocol to the Sangatte Protocol' was signed by France and the United Kingdom on 29 May 2000, juxtaposed controls were set up in the station. Eurostar passengers travelling to the UK clear exit checks from the Schengen Area (carried out by the French Border Police) as well as UK entry checks (conducted by the UK Border Force) in the station before boarding their train. PARAFE self-service gates are available in the station which eligible passengers (EU, EEA and Swiss citizens aged 12 or above holding biometric passports) can use to clear French exit immigration checks (instead of a staffed counter). ePassport gates have also been installed in the station, which eligible passengers (UK, EU, EEA, Swiss, Australian, Canadian, Japanese, New Zealand, Singaporean, South Korean and United States citizens (as well as other foreign nationals who have applied for the Registered Traveller scheme) aged 12 or over holding biometric passports) can use to clear UK entry immigration instead of a staffed counter.

By 2015, the Gare du Nord was reportedly the busiest railway station in Europe, handling in excess of 700,000 passengers during a typical day. Most of these passengers are commuters travelling in from the northern suburbs of Paris and outlying towns; only 3 per cent of the traffic has been attributed to Eurostar's international services.

There is a further construction project to build a connecting underground passageway between Gare du Nord and Gare de l'Est, which is projected to open in 2025. When open the Gare du Nord-Gare de l'Est complex (including Magenta & La Chapelle) will have 77 platforms.

Security for the station is provided by the French police, the railways police and private security companies. Due to the position of the station as a gateway to the northern suburbs of Paris, there are some parts of the station where security incidents occur from time to time.

Refurbishment
The SNCF has long sought to improve the station to better handle traffic, particularly following the expansion of high speed rail services during the 1990s and 2000s accompanied by rising passenger numbers. By 2015, 700,000 passengers were using the Gare du Nord each day; projections produced in 2018 predicted these numbers to rise to 800,000 by 2024 and 900,000 by 2030. During 2015, the architect Jean-Michel Wilmotte was engaged by SNCF with the directive to "open the station towards the city". According to SNCF Project Director Stéphane Cougnon, the programme has a budget in excess of 600 million euros (£526m). The endeavour has the public backing of Paris' mayor, Anne Hidalgo, who has also pledged to address the frequent traffic problems in front of the station by reconfiguring its approaches. Critics of the redevelopment have included several architects and urban planners, who have typically objected to the high level of commercialisation involved.

The changes to the Gare du Nord shall be substantial, expanding its footprint to roughly two and a half times its pre-refurbishment footprint, turning it into the largest railway station in Europe. The expansion shall be facilitated largely by increasing the building's height, as well as by pulling back the outer walls in several places. The work shall build upon the existing philosophy of keeping arriving and departing passengers separated; all mainline departures are to be centralised within a new building alongside the eastern façade. To improve the station's interconnectivity with the rest of the city, the SNCF has reportedly considered the construction of a new eastern façade along the rue du Faubourg Saint-Denis to give direct access to the new departures terminal, as well as a new bus terminal.

Various new onsite amenities shall be provisioned across 50,000m2 of floorspace, representing a five-fold increase. Amongst the various retailers and commercial operations planned are two restaurants that are to operate on the station's roof, along with a gym, tennis court, putting range, 1 km fitness trail along the façade, and in excess of 7,000m2 of green space. To improve accessibility throughout, a total of 55 lifts and 105 escalators shall be installed, more than doubling the pre-redevelopment number. Eco-friendly considerations have also been made, conforming with the demanding BREEAM standards and incorporating features such as 3,200m2 of solar panels. Despite the ambitious scope, great care shall be taken to preserving its historic architecture and appearance, the station having been regarded as a national heritage site in its own right. The project has reportedly been modelled using several other major stations, including London St Pancras and New York's Grand Central Terminal.

During June 2019, a city commission opted to initially deny a construction permit associated with the project. Nonetheless, work commenced on the refurbishment during late 2019, and is scheduled to be completed during late 2023. The station will remain open during the renovations despite the increased technical challenge posed by doing so, the cost of closure being judged to be too great. Substantial planning has gone into minimising disruption and maximising passenger comfort throughout the programme. Some portions of the station, such as the relatively recent facilities for Eurostar services, shall remain relatively untouched. In addition to work on the station site itself, SNCF shall be making alterations along the entire northern corridor within this period in association with the redevelopment work. It is reportedly intended for the station's refurbishment to be completed by 2024, the year in which Paris is to host the Olympic Games.

In popular culture
The Gare du Nord has served as a backdrop in numerous French films, such as Les Poupées Russes.

In Nancy Mitford's The Pursuit of Love, Linda first meets Fabrice in the Gare du Nord when she runs out of resources and is sitting weeping on her suitcase.

In US movies, both the exterior and the interior of the Gare du Nord are seen in the 2002 film The Bourne Identity with Matt Damon and again in the trilogy's finale, The Bourne Ultimatum, released in August 2007. It was also seen in Ocean's Twelve in 2004, and Mr Bean's Holiday in 2007. The ending of the 2012 movie The Raven by James McTeigue takes place at the station.

Scenes of Gossip Girl episode "Double Identity" were shot inside the Gare du Nord.

Train services
The following services currently call at Paris Nord:

High speed services (Eurostar) Paris – London
High speed services (Thalys)
Paris – Brussels – Amsterdam
Paris – Brussels – Cologne – Essen – Dortmund
Paris – Brussels – Cologne
High speed services (TGV)
Paris – Lille
Paris – Lille – Tourcoing
Paris – Lille – Calais
Paris – Lille – Calais – Boulogne – Rang-du-Fliers
Paris – Lille – Dunkerque
Paris – Arras – Béthune – Dunkerque
Paris – Arras – Douai – Valenciennes
Regional services (Transilien)
Paris – Saint-Denis – Montsoult-Maffliers – Luzarches
Paris – Saint-Denis – Montsoult-Maffliers – Persan-Beaumont
Paris – Saint-Denis – Ermont-Eaubonne – Persan-Beaumont
Paris – Saint-Denis – Ermont-Eaubonne – Pontoise
Paris – Aulnay-sous-Bois – Mitry-Claye – Crépy-en-Valois
Regional services (TER Hauts-de-France)
Paris – Crépy-en-Valois – Soissons – Laon
Paris – Creil – Compiègne – Tergnier – Saint-Quentin
Paris – Persan-Beaumont – Beauvais
Paris – Orry-la-Ville – Creil – Saint-Just-en-Chaussée – Breteuil – Amiens

RER
Gare du Nord is well connected to the Paris RER network. Lines B and D call at platforms under the station. Line B serves Charles de Gaulle Airport (Roissy), Mitry – Claye in the north-east of the city and Antony (for Orly Airport), Massy-Palaiseau (for Massy TGV) and Saint-Rémy-lès-Chevreuse in south-west Paris. Line D offers a quick connection between Gare du Nord and Gare de Lyon and many areas of south-east Paris. Line D also operates to northern Paris, to Saint-Denis and Creil.

Both lines B and D serve Stade de France in Saint-Denis.

The RER station is directly connected to Magenta station, which was constructed further underground to the east of the Gare du Nord. It is served by the RER E line that offers a link between the Gare du Nord and Saint-Lazare/Gare Saint-Lazare and to eastern Paris, to Bondy, Chelles and Tournan-en-Brie.

Paris Métro

Lines 4 and 5, whose following station is Gare de l'Est.
There has been a connecting hallway connecting the RER station with La Chapelle on Line 2 since the 1990s.

See also

List of Paris railway stations
List of stations of the Paris RER
List of stations of the Paris Métro
List of works by Henri Chapu Sculptor of statue representing Beauvais

References

Citations

Bibliography

Nilsen, Micheline. "Railways and the Western European Capitals: Studies of Implantation in London, Paris, Berlin, and Brussels." Springer, 2008. .

External links

Gare du Nord.fr  Information on visiting Gare du Nord
Images of Gare du Nord
Gare du Nord Photo Tour |Paris By Train
Gare du Nord shops and general info about the station
High-resolution 360° Panorama of Gare du Nord |Art Atlas

Railway termini in Paris
Réseau Express Régional stations
Buildings and structures in the 10th arrondissement of Paris
Railway stations in France opened in 1846
Infrastructure completed in 1864
Railway stations served by Eurostar
French railway stations with juxtaposed controls